Elaine Fleming is a former mayor of Cass Lake, Minnesota, a position to which she was elected in 2003. Cass Lake—officially a city, but with a population under 1000—is located within the reservation boundaries of the Leech Lake Band of Ojibwe. She is a professor at Leech Lake Tribal College and the first Native American mayor of Cass Lake; she is aligned with the Green Party of Minnesota and is one of the organizers of Rock the Vote - Rez Style.

Cass Lake is a Superfund site, as a result of chemical dumping by the St. Regis Paper Company. Fleming has characterized St. Regis's activities as "environmental racism", which, in turn she has characterized as "terrorism in our communities". Fleming was elected mayor for her first term by seven votes. Fleming was elected mayor for a second term as a write-in campaign. As of 2006, Fleming was serving her second and last term as Mayor of Cass Lake, Minnesota.

Fleming has been involved in animal rescue since 2011.

References

 —, "Progressive City Leaders", The Nation, June 18, 2005, p. 18-19.

Year of birth missing (living people)
Ojibwe people
Mayors of places in Minnesota
Living people
Minnesota Greens
Women mayors of places in Minnesota
People from Cass Lake, Minnesota
21st-century American women
21st-century Native American women
21st-century Native Americans